RMAS may refer to:

 Royal Military Academy Sandhurst
 Royal Maritime Auxiliary Service of the United Kingdom
 Remote Memory Administration System an operations support system used in the Bell System
 Rape Myth Acceptance Scale